Oracle Warehouse Builder (OWB) is an ETL tool produced by Oracle that offers a graphical environment to build, manage and maintain data integration processes in business intelligence systems.

Features 

The primary use for OWB is consolidation of heterogeneous data sources in data warehousing and data migration from legacy systems. Further it offers capabilities for relational, dimensional and metadata data modeling, data profiling, data cleansing and data auditing. Whereas the core functionality is part of the Oracle database since version 10gR2, some of the latter features are sold separately as options. OWB uses a variant of Tcl over Java and PL/SQL called OMB+.

History 
Oracle Warehouse Builder was built from the ground up in Oracle, it was first released in January 2000 (release 2.0.4). The 3i release significantly enhanced the ETL mapping designer, then 9i in 2003 introduced the mapping debugger, process flow editing, integrated match/merging and name/address cleansing, multi-table insert, scripting, RAC certification to name a few. The 10gR1 release was essentially a certification of the 10g database, and the 10gR2 release (code named Paris) was a huge release incorporating a wide spectrum of functionality from dimensional modelling to data profiling and quality. The OWB 11gR1 release was a move into the database release stack, and included the server components being installed with the database and MDM connectors.

The packaging as part of the Oracle Developer Suite ended in May 2006 with the release of OWB 10gR2 (10g Release 2), when the core functions were included in Oracle 10gR2 Standard Edition and Enterprise Edition.

With the introduction of Oracle 11g in July 2007 the OWB version was updated to 11gR1 (11g Release 1).

Version 11.2 (11g Release 2) was released with the 11gR2 Oracle Database in September 2009. Its features include support for Oracle OBI EE, and native access to an extensible set of non-Oracle platforms using customizable and user-definable code templates.

Future integration with Oracle Data Integrator

, Oracle plans to integrate OWB with Oracle Data Integrator (ODI), an ETL tool Oracle acquired when it took over Sunopsis in 2006. In the short term, OWB and ODI will continue to be released independently, with each release being closer to integrating the two products. The Warehouse Builder 11.2 code template support is in fact derived from and largely compatible with the Oracle Data Integrator Knowledge Module framework. Oracle has publicly commented on plans to release a data integration product that will unify features from both of the current offerings.

UPDATE:
According to Oracle Data Integrator and Oracle Warehouse Builder Statement of Direction (First Published January 2010, 
Updated May 2011):

No major enhancements are planned for Oracle Warehouse Builder beyond the OWB
11.2 release. OWB 11.2 continues to be available and supported by Oracle, and patches
and bug fixes will continue to be offered at regular intervals. Oracle will continue to
support OWB 11.2 for the full lifetime of Database 11g and the full lifetime of the next
major database release (“Database 12”) in accordance with Oracle’s Lifetime Support
Policies for Database releases. Future database releases beyond Database 12 would
not be certified with OWB 11.2.

OMB+ 

Script everything. 

Use older versions of Oracle documentation

Think lists

References

External links 
 Oracle Warehouse Builder official site (now integrated in Oracle Data Integrator)
 Discussion forum
 Oracle Warehouse Builder blog

2000 software
Warehouse Builder
Extract, transform, load tools
Data warehousing products